The Adventure of Doctor Kircheisen is a 1921 German silent drama film directed by Rudolf Biebrach and stars Lotte Neumann, Hermann Thimig and Hans Marr. The script was by Robert Wiene, based on the novel Das Mangobaumwunder by Paul Frank and Leo Perutz.

It premièred at the Union-Theater Nollendorfplatz and at the U-T Kurfürstendamm (Filmbühne Wien) on 23 September 1921.

Cast
 Lotte Neumann
 Hermann Thimig
 Hans Marr
 Albert Kunze
 Mabel May-Yong
 Leopold von Ledebur

References

Bibliography

External links

1921 films
Films of the Weimar Republic
German silent feature films
German drama films
Films directed by Rudolf Biebrach
Films based on Austrian novels
1921 drama films
German black-and-white films
UFA GmbH films
Silent drama films
1920s German films
1920s German-language films